Jack La Rue (born Gaspare Biondolillo; May 3, 1902 – January 11, 1984) was an American film and stage actor.

Early Life and Family 
Gaspare Biondolillo was the son of Sicilian immigrants Luigi Biondolillo (1874-1951) and Giuseppa (LoBue) Biondolillo (1879-1970). A miner from the town of Lercara Friddi, Luigi married Giuseppa on May 20, 1899. Not long thereafter, Luigi emigrated from Sicily to the port of New York on the steamer 'Vincenzo Florio', accompanied by his sister Francesca. Arriving on Aug 26, 1900, the two siblings joined their brother Pasquale, who was living at 99 West Houston Drive in the "Little Italy" section of Manhattan (from records published on Ancestry.com). 

Giuseppa emigrated later, arriving in New York aboard the 'Gallia' on November 26, 1902. She brought along her 5 month old son Gaspare, and was accompanied by her parents Antonio Lobue and Rosalia (Lucania) LoBue, and their 15 year old son Giuseppe (Giuseppa's brother). They joined Luigi, who was then living at 416 East 11th Street in Manhattan (from records published on Ancestry.com). 

Gaspare or "Jasper" was the oldest of six children; the others were Mary (Maria), Lena (Angelina), Rose (Rosalia), Pauline (Paolina), and Emily (Emilia). The sisters were all born in New York, but Gaspare was born in Lercara Friddi, Sicily. The various state and federal records are vary on this, some stating that Jasper was born in New York (from records published on Ancestry.com). 

According to the 1920 U.S. Census, Luigi Biondolillo was employed at a piano factory in New York. On his declaration of intent for naturalization in 1926, he describes himself as a plasterer. In the 1930 U.S. Census, he is listed as a painter in a piano factory in New York. On the same census, Jasper is listed as still living with his parents. However, not long thereafter, he moved to Hollywood to begin his film career (from records published on Ancestry.com). 

Jasper's father Luigi had another brother Gioacchino Biondolillo, who emigrated to New York in 1906. He was called "Jack". Gaspare adopted this as his first name for the stage. His surname "La Rue" was derived from his mother's maiden name of LoBue, sometimes written as two words "Lo Bue" (from records published on Ancestry.com).

Jack vowed to bring his family to live with him in Hollywood once he had a little money. "Mom's a great cook", he said.  He made good on his word, and in the 1940 U.S. census, Luigi, Giuseppa, and daughters Rose and Emily were living at Jack's home at 6244 Morella Avenue in North Hollywood. Jack occupation was listed as "Motion Picture Actor" (from records published on Ancestry.com). 

Jack's sister Pauline married Charles Raymond (Carmelo) Cognata on June 3, 1935 in New York City. In the 1940 census they were living in Kings, where Charles was employed as a musician. Sometime after that, they relocated to North Hollywood. In the 1950 census, the couple was living in Jack's home with their three sons. Jack's parents and sister Emily continued to reside in the home, however Jack's sister Rose, who married Peter Scamporino in 1943, had departed Jack was also gone, married to Baroness Violet Edith von Rosenberg at the time. (from records published on Ancestry.com). 

Jack's sister Emily, born May 16, 1917, was 15 years younger than Jack. She relocated to Hollywood while still a teenager to follow in her big brother's footsteps. She did make one change when taking her screen name, preferring to spell her last name with no spacing (LaRue) whereas opposed to her brother who used "La Rue" with a space. Her screen debut came in "College Rhythm" (1934) and she went on to appear in titles like "Gold Diggers of 1935" (1935), "It Couldn't Have Happened (But It Did)" (1936), "Zaza" (1938), and "A New Kind of Love" (1963). Keeping busy into the 1960s, LaRue remained close to her older brother until his death in 1984. Married and divorced at least twice, Emily LaRue passed away on October 3, 2005 at the age of 88.

Jack's nephew Ronald Cognata also followed in Jack's footsteps, taking the stage name Jack La Rue, Jr. He married actress Kim Darby on October 8, 1978 (they divorced on June 30, 1981). Jack La Rue, Jr. is known for has roles in Crypt of the Living Dead (1973) and The Young Nurses (1973).

Stage 
La Rue went from high school to his first acting job in Otis Skinner's road company production of Blood and Sand. He performed in Broadway plays from around 1923 to 1931. According to La Rue, while appearing in Mae West's play Diamond Lil, he was spotted by Howard Hawks, who offered him a part in the film Scarface (1932), starring Paul Muni.

Film 
Jack moved to Hollywood sometime after 1930, where he appeared in numerous films. However, Scarface was not one of them. La Rue stated in a newspaper article that, after four days, Hawks had to replace him with George Raft because La Rue was taller than Muni and had a more powerful voice. Later, however, Raft turned down the role of the despicable villain in The Story of Temple Drake (1933), fearing it would damage his screen image, so the part went to La Rue. Sometimes mistaken for Humphrey Bogart, he played thugs and gangsters for the most part. However, director Frank Borzage atypically cast him as a priest in the 1932 version of A Farewell to Arms simply because, according to newspaper columnist Hubbard Keavy, he was "tired of seeing conventional characters". La Rue stated he turned down a role in The Godfather (1972) and many parts in the television series The Untouchables because of the way they portrayed Italian-Americans.

Personal life 
He was married three times. La Rue married Los Angeles socialite Constance Deighton Simpson on September 22, 1938, in London. She obtained a divorce on December 17, 1946, charging him with mental cruelty. In 1955, he obtained an annulment from former Baroness Violet Edith von Rosenberg after six years of marriage, claiming she had only married him to obtain American citizenship and that they separated after less than two months. He married Anne Giordano on August 12, 1962; she obtained an annulment in 1967. La Rue had no children. 

La Rue died of a heart attack at Saint John's Health Center in Santa Monica, California, at the age of 81. He was buried in Holy Cross Cemetery, Culver City, California.

Complete filmography

The Lucky Devil (1925) as Prizefight Attendant (uncredited)
The King on Main Street (1925) as Member of King's Retinue in Paris Hotel Lobby (uncredited)
Fine Manners (1926) as New Year's Eve Celebrant (uncredited)
East Side, West Side (1927) as Dining Extra (uncredited)
The House of Terror (1928) a 10-chapter serial, today considered lost
Follow the Leader (1930) as A Gangster
Night World (1932) as Henchman (uncredited)
The Mouthpiece (1932) as Joe Garland (uncredited)
While Paris Sleeps (1932) as Julot
Radio Patrol (1932) as Slick (uncredited)
Blessed Event (1932) as Louis De Marco (uncredited)
The All American (1932) as Joe Fiore
Virtue (1932) as Toots
Three on a Match (1932) as Ace's Henchman (uncredited)
I Am a Fugitive from a Chain Gang (1932) as Ackerman (uncredited)
Man Against Woman (1932) as Alberti
A Farewell to Arms (1932) as The Priest
Lawyer Man (1932) as Spike Murphy (uncredited)
The Woman Accused (1933) as Little Maxie
42nd Street (1933) as Mug with Murphy (uncredited)
Christopher Strong (1933) as Carlo
Terror Aboard (1933) as Gregory Cordoff
The Story of Temple Drake (1933) as Trigger
The Girl in 419 (1933) as Sammy
Gambling Ship (1933) as Pete Manning
Headline Shooter (1933) as Ricci
To the Last Man (1933) as Jim Daggs
The Kennel Murder Case (1933) as Eduardo Grassi
Miss Fane's Baby Is Stolen (1934) as Bert
Good Dame (1934) as Bluch Brown
The Fighting Rookie (1934) as Patrolman Jim Trent
Straight Is the Way (1934) as Monk
Take the Stand (1934) as George Gaylord
No Ransom (1934) as Larry Romero
Secret of the Chateau (1934) as Lucien Vonaire
Calling All Cars (1935) as Jerry Kennedy
Times Square Lady (1935) as Jack Kramer 
Men of the Hour (1935) as Nick Thomas
The Headline Woman (1935) as Phil Zarias
Under the Pampas Moon (1935) as Bazan
The Daring Young Man (1935) as Cubby
After the Dance (1935) as Mitch
Little Big Shot (1935) as Doré
Special Agent (1935) as Jake Andrews
His Night Out (1935) as Joe Ferranza
Waterfront Lady (1935) as Tom Braden
The Spanish Cape Mystery (1935) as Gardner
Hot Off the Press (1935) as Bill Jeffrey
Remember Last Night? (1935) as Baptiste
Strike Me Pink (1936) as Mr. Thrust 
The Bridge of Sighs (1936) as Packy Lacy
In Paris, A.W.O.L. (1936) as Soldier
Dancing Pirate (1936) as Lt. Chago (Baltazar's Aide)
It Couldn't Have Happened – But It Did (1936) as Smiley Clark
Born to Fight (1936) as Smoothy Morgan
A Tenderfoot Goes West (1936) as James Killer Madden
Ellis Island (1936) as Dude
Yellow Cargo (1936) as Al Perrelli
Go West, Young Man (1936) as Rico in 'Drifting Lady'
Mind Your Own Business (1936) as Cruger
Her Husband Lies (1937) as 'Trigger, ' Gunman
That I May Live (1937) as Charlie
Captains Courageous (1937) as Priest 
Dangerous Holiday (1937) as Gollenger
Trapped by G-Men (1937) as Fred Drake
Arson Gang Busters (1938) as Bud Morgan
Under the Big Top (1938) as Ricardo Le Grande
Valley of the Giants (1938) as Ed Morrell
I Demand Payment (1938) as Smiles Badolio
Murder in Soho (1939) as Steve Marco
The Gang's All Here (1939) as Alberni
Big Town Czar (1939) as Mike Luger
In Old Caliente (1939) as Sujarno
Charlie Chan in Panama (1940) as Manolo
Forgotten Girls (1940) as Eddie Nolan
Enemy Agent (1940) as Alex
The Sea Hawk (1940) as Lt. Ortega 
Fugitive from a Prison Camp (1940) as Red Nelson
East of the River (1940) as Frank 'Frisco' Scarfi 
Footsteps in the Dark (1941) as Ace Vernon 
Paper Bullets (1941) as Mickey Roman
Ringside Maisie (1941) as Ricky Du Prez
 Gentleman from Dixie (1941) as Thad Terrill
Hard Guy (1941) as Vic Monroe
Swamp Woman (1941) as Pete Oliver / Pierre Pertinax Pontineau Briand Broussicourt d'Olivier
A Desperate Chance for Ellery Queen (1942) as Tommy Gould
Pardon My Sarong (1942) as Tabor (uncredited)
Highways by Night (1942) as Johnny Lieber, Gangster
X Marks the Spot (1942) as Marty Clark
The Payoff (1942) as John Angus
American Empire (1942) as Pierre- Beauchard Henchman
You Can't Beat the Law (1943) as Cain
A Gentle Gangster (1943) as Hugo
Secret Service in Darkest Africa (1943 serial) as Hassan (Ch. 6) (uncredited)
The Law Rides Again (1943) as Duke Dillon
The Girl from Monterrey (1943) as Al Johnson
A Scream in the Dark (1943) as Det. Lt. Cross
Never a Dull Moment (1943) as Joey
Pistol Packin' Mama (1943) as Johnny Rossi
The Sultan's Daughter (1943) as Rata
The Desert Song (1943) as Lieutenant Bertin
Smart Guy (1943) as Matt Taylor
Follow the Leader (1944) as Larry
Machine Gun Mama (1944) as Jose
Leave It to the Irish (1944) as Rockwell
The Last Ride (1944) as Joe Genna
Dangerous Passage (1944) as Mike Zomano
Steppin' in Society (1945) as Bow Tie
The Spanish Main (1945) as Lt. Escobar
Dakota (1945) as Suade
Cornered (1945) as Diego, Hotel Valet
Road to Utopia (1945) as LeBec
Murder in the Music Hall (1946) as Bruce Wilton
In Old Sacramento (1946) as Laramie 
Santa Fe Uprising (1946) as Bruce Jackson
My Favorite Brunette (1947) as Tony
Bush Pilot (1947) as Paul Girard
Robin Hood of Monterey (1947) as Don Ricardo Gonzales
No Orchids for Miss Blandish (1948) as Slim Grisson
For Heaven's Sake (1950) as Tony Clark
Ride the Man Down (1952) as Kennedy
Slaughter on Tenth Avenue (1957) as Father Paul (uncredited)
40 Pounds of Trouble (1962) as Nick the Greek (uncredited)
Robin and the 7 Hoods (1964) as Tomatoes
For Those Who Think Young (1964) as Cronin's Business Associate
The Spy in the Green Hat (1967) as Federico "Feet" Stilletto
Paesano: A Voice in the Night (1975) as Bartender
Won Ton Ton, the Dog Who Saved Hollywood (1976) as Silent Film Villain

References

External links

1902 births
1984 deaths
Male actors from New York City
American male film actors
American male stage actors
American people of Italian descent
Burials at Holy Cross Cemetery, Culver City
20th-century American male actors